Burcher or Bürcher is a surname. Notable people with the surname include:

Catherine Wright Burcher (1849–1921), New Zealand artist
David Burcher (born 1950), rugby player
Ian Burcher, Australian field hockey player
Pierre Bürcher (born 1945), bishop

See also
Burcher, New South Wales, village in New South Wales, Australia
Bircher (disambiguation)